Marcus Braymont Moore (born November 2, 1970) is an American former Major League Baseball player. A pitcher, Moore played for the Colorado Rockies and Cincinnati Reds.

External links

1970 births
Living people
Baseball players from Oakland, California
Major League Baseball pitchers
African-American baseball players
Sacramento City Panthers baseball players
Cincinnati Reds players
Buffalo Bisons (minor league) players
Akron Aeros players
Colorado Rockies players
Colorado Springs Sky Sox players
Indianapolis Indians players
Yuma Bullfrogs players
Zion Pioneerzz players
American expatriate baseball players in Australia
Bend Bucks players
Central Valley Rockies players
Chattanooga Lookouts players
Dunedin Blue Jays players
Knoxville Blue Jays players
Quad Cities Angels players
Syracuse SkyChiefs players
21st-century African-American sportspeople
20th-century African-American sportspeople
Richmond High School (Richmond, California) alumni